The St. John's Red Storm women's basketball team represents St. John's University in New York City, New York, United States. The school's team competes in the Big East, where it has competed since the 1982–1983 season.  The women’s basketball team began competing in the AIAW in 1974–1975 under coach Vickie Kresse, obtaining a 10–8 record and its first winning season.  The Red Storm are coached by Joe Tartamella, who took the helm of the program in 2012.

Yearly records

Postseason results

NCAA Division I

AIAW Division I
The Red Storm made one appearance in the AIAW National Division I basketball tournament, with a combined record of 0–1.

Players selected in the WBL Draft
1981 – 2nd Round – Dallas Diamonds – Debbie Brajevich

Players selected in the WNBA draft

References

External links